Eurytus (fl. 400 BC) was an eminent Pythagorean philosopher who Iamblichus in one passage describes as a native of Croton, while in another, he enumerates him among the Tarentine Pythagoreans.

Biography
Eurytus was a disciple of Philolaus, and Diogenes Laërtius mentions him among the teachers of Plato, though this statement is very doubtful. It is uncertain whether Eurytus was the author of any work, unless we suppose that the fragment in Stobaeus, which is there ascribed to one Eurytus, belongs to this Eurytus.

Through a dubious commentary to Aristotle's Metaphysics a caricatural image of Eurytus has gained wide currency. A mediaeval writer confused with Alexander of Aphrodisias presented Eurytos as a kind of mosaic-setter who delineated various shapes with some definite number of pebbles.

Reviel Netz forcefully commented that "pseudo-Alexander’s picture of Eurytus the mosaicist is a non-starter for it is evidently idiotic"and he noted that "while Theophrastus and Aristotle both consider Eurytus’ results patently false, nothing suggests they consider his procedure silly". Taking in account specific mathematical usage he suggested an emended translation of the original passage from Aristotle's work (Metaphysics 1092b9-13):

According to the historian's from the Stanford Encyclopedia of Philosophy, Philolaus and Eurytus are identified by Aristoxenus as teachers of the last generation of Pythagoreans (D. L. VIII 46). An Echecrates is mentioned by Aristoxenus as a student of Philolaus and Eurytus. (p. 166)

References

Ancient Greek metaphysicians
Pythagoreans of Magna Graecia
Ancient Crotonians
4th-century BC philosophers
4th-century BC deaths
Year of birth unknown
Pythagoreans